Little Brown Jug may refer to:
"Little Brown Jug" (song), an 1869 song by Joseph Winner
Little Brown Jug (college football trophy), an American award dating to 1892
Little Brown Jug (horse racing), an American harness race for Standardbreds first run in 1946, or its namesake horse
Little Brown Jug (actor) or Don Reynolds (1937–2019), American child performer 
Little Brown Jug (plant) or  Hexastylis arifolia, a wildflower found in southeast United States
Little Brown Jug, a 1941 painting by American Thomas Hart Benton